Grace Zaring Stone (January 9, 1891 – September 29, 1991) was an American novelist and short-story writer. She is perhaps best known for having three of her novels made into films: The Bitter Tea of General Yen, Winter Meeting, and Escape. She also used the pseudonym Ethel Vance.

Biography
Born in New York City in 1891, Zaring Stone was the great-great-granddaughter of social reformer Robert Owen. Her mother died during her childhood. She started writing in St. Thomas in the Virgin Islands, where she lived with her husband, Ellis Spencer Stone (1889-1956), later a commodore in the U.S. Navy (where he commanded all of the aircraft carriers at the time of the Pearl Harbor attack on December 7, 1941 [none were lost as they were not at Pearl Harbor that day]). Later, she and her husband moved to Stonington, Connecticut. They had one child, the author and gardener, Eleanor Perenyi.

Zaring Stone had used the pseudonym of Ethel Vance to write her 1939 anti-Nazi thriller Escape to avoid jeopardizing her daughter, who was living in occupied Europe during the Second World War. Editions of her books after World War II sometimes credited her as "Grace Zaring Stone (Ethel Vance)", as Escape was her best-known book at the time of the war. Three of her novels --The Bitter Tea of General Yen, Escape, and Winter Meeting—were adapted for film. In 1955, Escape was translated into German and published in Germany as Die Flucht.

Death
Zaring Stone died on September 29, 1991 at the Mary Elizabeth Nursing Center in Mystic, Connecticut, aged 100.

Bibliography
Letters to a Djinn, 1922
The Heaven and Earth of Dona Elena, 1929
The Bitter Tea of General Yen, 1930
The Almond Tree, 1931 (published in England as All the Daughters of Music)
The Cold Journey, 1934
Escape, 1939 (as "Ethel Vance")
Reprisal, 1942 (as "Ethel Vance")
Winter Meeting, 1946 (as "Ethel Vance")
The Secret Thread, 1949 (as "Ethel Vance")
The Grotto, 1951 (published in England as My Son is Mortal under the "Ethel Vance" pseudonym)
Althea, 1962
Dear Deadly Cara, 1968

The Bitter Tea of General Yen, The Cold Journey, Escape, Reprisal and Winter Meeting were published as Armed Services Editions during WWII.

References

External links
 
 

1891 births
1991 deaths
Novelists from Connecticut
20th-century American novelists
20th-century American women writers
American women novelists
American women short story writers
American centenarians
People from Stonington, Connecticut
20th-century American short story writers
Women centenarians